Essen is a railway station in the town of Essen, Belgium. The station opened on 26 June 1854 on the Antwerp–Lage Zwaluwe railway, known in Belgium as Line 12. Essen is a border station between the Netherlands and Belgium.

Train services
The station is served by the following services:

Intercity services (IC-22) Essen - Antwerp - Mechelen - Brussels (weekdays)
Local services (L-22) Roosendaal - Essen - Antwerp - Puurs (weekdays)
Local services (L-22) Roosendaal - Essen - Antwerp (weekends)

External links
Belgian Railways website

Railway stations opened in 1854
Railway stations in Belgium
Railway stations in Antwerp Province
Essen, Belgium
1854 establishments in Belgium